According to European Commission, micro enterprises (or microbusinesses) are companies run by a maximum of 10 people with an annual turnover and total balance sheet below 2.000.000 EUR. The vast majority of micro enterprises (over 99%) are run by only one individual. They can be found mainly in emerging markets where they help to foster economic growth. 

In France, running a microbusiness (as an auto-entrepreneur or micro-entrepreneur) implies abiding by a tax policy specifically designed for companies with low turnovers. This legal status is legally restricted to freelance workers and employers (FWE)——retailers, artisans and a small number of professionals in private practice. This status is not subject to the usual Value-Added Tax (the State doesn't collect it and the company cannot claim it back) and prevents the company from any claim to governmental support programmes. Apart from these specifics, all microbusinesses abide by other FWE-targeted regulations.

Micro enterprises in France 
Microbusinesses fall into two groups: trading activities or non-trading activities. The tax status of any given micro enterprise is checked and approved by the tax office. The method of taxation depends on the company's annual turnover, up to 32,000 EUR without VAT (or 80,000 EUR without VAT for retailers).

Should a non-trading microbusiness fall into this tax status, the taxation is calculated over two thirds of the company's total sales over the year (regardless of the company's actual profits).

Should a trading microbusiness fall into this tax status, the taxation is calculated using:
 29% of the company's total sales over the year (regardless of the company's actual profits) provided the company performs retailing operations;
 50% of the yearly turnover for all other activities.

The microbusiness legal status was defined in Article 35 of the Economic Growth Incentive Law (published on 01/Aug/2003). Before the law, freelancers were expected to pay taxes either using the micro enterprise tax status defined in Article 50-0 of the General Tax Code or using the Special Declaratory Scheme defined in Article 102 of said General Tax Code. The provisions of the EGI law grant freelancers the ability to opt out of standard conditions for paying social contributions and charges (accounting provisions, regularization, minimum fees to start a business) in favour of the provisions defined in Article L 131-1 and Article L 136-3 of the Social Security Code (SSC).

Article 102 ter of the GTC defines a special declaratory scheme for non-trading profits (classified as BNC, for bénéfices non-commerciaux). This tax status is labelled "micro BNC". Profits from this status is exclusively restricted to people who do not earn more than 32,600 EUR exclusive of VAT over a calendar year (since 2011, the scheme should be valid up to 2013). In this situation, since 2006 the yearly Gross Operating Surplus (GOS) is minored by a 34% rate (was 37%).

Article 50-0 of the GTC defines the microbusiness tax status for crafting/trading/industrial company benefits. In other words, for industrial and commercial benefits (classified as BIC, for bénéfices industriels et commerciaux). This tax status is labelled "micro BIC" and restricted to companies with turnover limitations:
 <82,200 EUR VAT-free for businesses selling goods, food (whether on premises or to take out) or housing services. In this situation, the GOS is minored by a 71% flat-rate reduction since 2006 (was 72%)
 <32,900 EUR VAT-free in any other case of non-trading profit. Since 2006, this allows a 50% flat-rate reduction of the GOS (was 52%)

Note: If the business deals with both types of activities, the total turnover of the company must not exceed 82,200 EUR and the turnover related to non-trading activities must not exceed 32,900 EUR.

A minimum flat-rate reduction of 305 EUR is to be applied to the micro enterprise regardless of their tax status.

Notes and References

Further reference

Bibliography 
 Gilles Daïd and Pascal Nguyên, Le Guide pratique du micro-entrepreneur, Eyrolles Ed., January 2016, 265 pages.

Related Articles 
 Sole proprietor
 Partnership
 Independent contractor
 Freelancers
 Entrepreneurship

Business models